Vernon Franklin Gant (September 8, 1896 - January 15, 1959) served in the California State Assembly for the 46th district from 1927 to 1929 and during World War I he served in the United States Navy.

References

External links

United States Navy personnel of World War I
20th-century American politicians
Republican Party members of the California State Assembly
1896 births
1959 deaths